Dindi Joy Lacabe Pajares (born May 30, 1993) is a Filipino model, military reservist, entrepreneur, and beauty pageant titleholder who was appointed as Miss Supranational Philippines 2021. She represented the Philippines at the Miss Supranational 2021 pageant in Nowy Sącz, Poland and finished as a Top 12 semifinalist.

Personal life
Pajares is a military reservist at the Philippine Air Force Reserve Command and an international cabin crew. She also works as an international flight attendant and an entrepreneur owning a small merchandising business in her hometown, Bataan.

Pageantry

Miss Philippines Earth 2011
Pajares was only 18 years old when she represented Balanga, Bataan at Miss Philippines Earth 2011 held in Puerto Princesa, Palawan. She finished in the Top 20.

Binibining Pilipinas 2016
She joined Binibining Pilipinas 2016 and represented Balanga, Bataan. She was a finalist for the Best in National Costume. She finished top 15 to Maxine Medina of Quezon City.

Binibining Pilipinas 2017
On her second consecutive year, she joined the Binibining Pilipinas 2017 but was unplaced.

Miss World Philippines 2021
Pajares returned to the pageantry world and joined the Miss World Philippines 2021 pageant. Due to the pageant's postponement, the Miss World Philippines organization decided to appoint the Miss Supranational Philippines title. The winner was determined by the votes of all the official candidates. Pajares gained the highest votes making her the Miss Supranational Philippines 2021.

Miss Supranational 2021
Pajares represented the Philippines at the Miss Supranational 2021 pageant in Poland and finished as a Top 12 semifinalist.

References

1993 births
Living people
People from Bataan
Philippine Air Force personnel
Binibining Pilipinas contestants
Miss Philippines Earth contestants
Miss Supranational contestants
Miss World Philippines winners
Filipino female models